Peter-Lukas Graf (5 January 1929) is a Swiss flautist born in Zürich, Switzerland. He was a pupil of André Jaunet, and later attended the Paris Conservatoire, where he won first prize with Marcel Moyse and Roger Cortot. Besides playing the flute both in orchestras and as a soloist, he is a conductor, and spent several years exclusively as an orchestra and opera conductor. He is also a teacher, and has taught at the Basel Music Academy since 1973 and at the Music Academy Accademia Lorenzo Perosi in Biella. Graf played at James Galway's wedding in May 1972. In 2005 Graf received an honorary doctorate from the Academy of Music in Kraków.

Discography 
Peter-Lukas Graf has made many recordings in his career.

Solo flute 
Johann Sebastian Bach, Berio and others (Claves 50-8005).
Heiner Reitz (Vo.II) 12 Caprices (Telos Music TLS 026).
Peter Mieg, Les plaisirs de Rued (Claves P 610).

Flute and orchestra 
Luigi Boccherini, Cimarosa, Gluck (Jecklin 506-2).
Devienne, Jacques Ibert, (Claves 50-501).
Krommer (Grand Prix International du Disque) (Claves 50-8203).
Mozart (Claves 50-8505).
 Mozart: Concert for flute and harp (Claves 50-0208).
 Quantz, Stamitz, Stalder (Claves 50-808-9).
Pergolesi, Piccinni, Mercadante (Claves 50-9103).
Vivaldi (Claves 50-8807).
Reinecke, Carl Gottlieb Reissiger: Romantic flute concertos (Claves 50-2108).
Krommer: Sinfonia concertante for flute, clarinete and violin (Tudor 757).

Flute and harpsichord 
Johann Sebastian Bach (Claves 50-0401).
Johann Sebastian Bach (Jecklin 4400/1-2).
Haendel (Claves 50-0238).

Flute and piano 
Johann Sebastian Bach: Las cinco sonatas auténticas. (Claves 50-2511).
Schubert, Widor, Martinu, Poulenc: Clásicos para flauta Vol. 1. (Claves 50-9306).
Reinecke, Milhaud, Hindemith, Frank Martin, Prokofiev: Clásicos para flauta, Vol. 2. (Claves 50-9307).
Chaminade, Hüe, Gaubert: Joueurs de flûte (Claves 50-0704).
Joplin (Ragtimes) (Claves 50-8715).
Kuhlau: Sonatas (Claves 50-8705).
Czerny, Kuhlau: Virtuoso flute (Jecklin 577-)

Flute and guitar 
Bach, Schubert, Mozart: Transcriptions (Claves 50-9705).
Bach, Chopin, Ibert, Mozart, Ravel, Villa-Lobos: Miniatures (Claves 50-2013).
Carulli: 6 Serenades (Claves 50-8304).
Giuliani, Carulli, Ibert, Ravel, Willy Burkhard (Claves 50-0408).

Flute and harp 
Rossini, Donizetti, Louis Spohr, Paganini, Fauré, Lauber: Duos (Claves 50-0708).
Debussy, Sonata No. 2. Ravel, Introducción y Allegro: French Masterpieces. (Claves 50-0280).
Peter Mieg, Morceau élégant (Claves P 610 y Jecklin Edition JS 314-2))

Chamber music 
F.Bach, Briccialdi: "2 flutes J.S.Bach, Kuhlau, Doppler: Trios 2 fl/piano (Claves 50-2006).
Beethoven: Triosonata, Serenade in D major (flute, violin and viola) (Claves 50-8403).
Reger: 2 Serenades (flute, violin and viola) (Claves 50-8104).
Krommer: 3 flute quartets op. 17/92/93 (Claves 50-8708)
Peter Mieg: Quintuor (flute, 2 violins, chello and harpsichord) (Claves P 610)
Mozart: 4 quartets Carmina Quartet (Claves 50-9014).
Mozart: 4 quartets (Ex Libris CD-6087).
Rossini: 4 quartets (Nr. 1, 2, 4, 6). (Claves 50-8608).
Bach: The Musical Offering (Claves 50-0198).
Bach, Haendel, Rameau, Scarlatti, Martin, Ravel and Albert Roussel: Song Recital (K. Graf, soprano) (Claves 50-0604).
Bach, Haendel, Quantez, Couperin, Vivaldi and Lotti: Baroque chamber music for flute, oboe and harpsichord'', P.L. Graf, Goritzki and Dähler. (Claves 50-0404).

References

Swiss flautists
Classical flautists
1929 births
Living people